This is a list of diplomatic missions of Bulgaria, excluding honorary consulates.

Current missions

Africa 
 
 Algiers (Embassy)
 
 Cairo (Embassy)
 
 Addis Ababa (Embassy)
 
 Tripoli (Embassy)
 
 Rabat (Embassy)
 
 Abuja (Embassy)
 
 Pretoria (Embassy)
 
 Tunis (Embassy)

Americas 
 
 Buenos Aires (Embassy)
 
 Brasília (Embassy)
 
 Ottawa (Embassy)
 Toronto (Consulate-General)
 
 Havana (Embassy)
 
 Mexico City (Embassy)
 
 Washington, D.C. (Embassy)
 Chicago (Consulate-General)
 Los Angeles (Consulate-General)
 New York (Consulate-General)

Asia 
 
 Yerevan (Embassy)
 
 Baku (Embassy)
 
 Beijing (Embassy)
 Shanghai (Consulate-General)
 
 Tbilisi (Embassy)
 
 New Delhi (Embassy)
 
 Jakarta (Embassy)
 
 Tehran (Embassy)
 
 Baghdad (Embassy)
 
 Tel Aviv (Embassy)
 
 Tokyo (Embassy)
 
 Amman (Embassy)
 
 Astana (Embassy)
 
 Kuwait City (Embassy)
 
 Beirut (Embassy)

 Ulaanbaatar (Embassy)
 
 Pyongyang (Embassy)
 
 Islamabad (Embassy)
 
 Ramallah (Diplomatic Bureau)
 
 Doha (Embassy)

 Riyadh (Embassy)
 
 Seoul (Embassy)
 
 Damascus (Embassy)
 
 Ankara (Embassy)
 Edirne (Consulate-General)
 Istanbul (Consulate-General)
 Bursa (Consulate)
 
 Abu Dhabi (Embassy)
 Dubai (Consulate-General)
 
 Tashkent (Embassy)
 
 Hanoi (Embassy)

Europe 
 
 Tirana (Embassy)
 
 Vienna (Embassy)
 
 Minsk (Embassy)
 
 Brussels (Embassy)
 
 Sarajevo (Embassy)
 
 Zagreb (Embassy)
 
 Nicosia (Embassy)
 
 Prague (Embassy)
 
 Copenhagen (Embassy)
 
 Helsinki (Embassy)
 
 Paris (Embassy)
 
 Berlin (Embassy)
 Frankfurt (Consulate General)
 Munich (Consulate General)
 
 Athens (Embassy)
 Thessaloniki (Consulate General)
 
 Rome (Embassy)
 
 Budapest (Embassy)
 
 Dublin (Embassy)
 
 Rome (Embassy)

 Pristina (Embassy)
 
 Chişinău (Embassy)
 
 Podgorica (Embassy)
 
 The Hague (Embassy)
 
 Skopje (Embassy)
 Bitola (Consulate-General)
 
 Oslo (Embassy)
 
 Warsaw (Embassy)
 
 Lisbon (Embassy)
 
 Bucharest (Embassy)
 
 Moscow (Embassy)
 Saint Petersburg (Consulate-General)
 Yekaterinburg (Consulate)
 
 Belgrade (Embassy)
 Niš (Consulate-General)
 
 Bratislava (Embassy)
 
 Ljubljana (Embassy)
 
 Madrid (Embassy)
 Barcelona (Consulate-General)
 Valencia (Consulate-General)
 
 Stockholm (Embassy)
 
 Berne (Embassy)
 
 Kyiv (Embassy)
 Odessa (Consulate-General)
 
 London (Embassy)

Oceania 
 
 Canberra (Embassy)

Multilateral organizations 
 Brussels (Permanent Mission to the European Union and NATO)
 Geneva (Permanent Mission to the United Nations, World Trade Organization and other organisations)
 New York (Permanent Mission to the United Nations)
 Paris (Permanent Mission to UNESCO)
 Strasbourg (Permanent Mission to the Council of Europe)
 Vienna (Permanent Mission to the United Nations, Organization for Security and Co-operation in Europe and other organisations)

Gallery

Closed missions

Africa

Americas

Asia

Europe

See also
 Foreign relations of Bulgaria

Notes

References
Bulgarian Ministry of Foreign Affairs

 
Diplomatic missions
Bulgaria